Shijiazhuang University (石家庄学院 Shíjiāzhuāng xuéyuàn) is a university in Shijiazhuang, Hebei, China.

Campuses 
There are two campuses: North Campus and South Campus with 82 hectares of land and 350,000 square meters of floor space.

References

External links 
Shijiazhuang University

Universities and colleges in Hebei
Educational institutions established in 1956
1956 establishments in China